The Eight Dimensions is the third studio album by Taiwanese singer Jay Chou, released on 18 July 2002 by BMG Taiwan.

The album was nominated for five Golden Melody Awards. The album also won for an IFPI Hong Kong Top Sales Music Award for Best Selling Mandarin Album of the Year.

The tracks, "Secret Sign", "Back to the Past", and "The Final Battle", are listed at number 1, number 5, and number 42 respectively on the 2002's Hit FM Top 100 Singles of the Year chart.

Track listing

Awards

References

External links
  Jay Chou discography@JVR Music

2002 albums
Bertelsmann Music Group albums
Jay Chou albums